ShimmerCat was a web server designed from ground-up for HTTP/2 and written in Haskell; it now appears to be an image optimization and distribution service. The purported purpose of the server was to take full advantage of HTTP/2 features, including HTTP/2 Server Push, to enhance the perceived page load speed of served websites. ShimmerCat used machine learning to accelerate asset delivery to the browser.

Overview
As of September 2016, ShimmerCat was at version 1.5.0 and ran on Linux and OS X. The software could be used for development of web applications through its SOCKS5 and HTTP/2 implementations, and it was also possible to develop web applications without having to modify /etc/hosts nor use different sets of URLs for development and production.

References

Application layer protocols
Internet Protocol based network software
Proxy server software for Linux
Reverse proxy
Unix network-related software
Web server software for Linux